Alfredo Carlos Arias Sánchez (born 28 November 1958 in Shangrilá) is a Uruguayan football manager and former player who played as a forward.  He is the current manager of Peñarol.

Managerial statistics

References

External links
 

1958 births
Living people
People from Ciudad de la Costa
Uruguayan footballers
Uruguayan expatriate footballers
Uruguayan football managers
Club Nacional de Football players
Montevideo Wanderers F.C. players
Liverpool F.C. (Montevideo) players
Peñarol players
Tampico Madero F.C. footballers
Segunda División players
Real Jaén footballers
C.D. Huachipato footballers
Trasandino footballers
O'Higgins F.C. footballers
Club Deportivo Palestino footballers
Chilean Primera División players
Expatriate footballers in Chile
Expatriate footballers in Spain
Expatriate footballers in Mexico
Expatriate football managers in Chile
Uruguayan Primera División managers
Montevideo Wanderers managers
Santiago Wanderers managers
C.S. Emelec managers
Club Bolívar managers
Universidad de Chile managers
Deportivo Cali managers
Independiente Santa Fe managers
Peñarol managers
Expatriate football managers in Bolivia
Expatriate football managers in Ecuador
Expatriate football managers in Colombia
Uruguayan expatriate sportspeople in Chile
Uruguayan expatriate sportspeople in Bolivia
Uruguayan expatriate sportspeople in Ecuador
Uruguayan expatriate sportspeople in Colombia
Association football forwards